Henter is a surname. Notable people with the surname include:

Frank Henter (born 1964), German swimmer
Ted Henter, American computer programmer and businessman

See also
Hester
Hunter (surname)
Menter